Fast Charlie is an upcoming American action thriller film directed by Phillip Noyce and written by Richard Wenk, based on the 2001 novel Gun Monkeys by Victor Gischler. It stars Pierce Brosnan, James Caan (in his final film appearance), and Morena Baccarin.

Premise 
For twenty years, Charlie Swift has been a fixer and hitman for a mob boss named Stan. After a rival boss puts a hit on Stan and his crew, Charlie is the sole survivor. Charlie decides to avenge his friend and teams up with Marcie, the ex-wife of a mobster he killed.

Cast 
 Pierce Brosnan as Charlie Swift
 James Caan as Stan
 Morena Baccarin as Marcie

Production 
In June 2009, Victor Gischler's 2001 novel Gun Monkeys was optioned for a film adaptation, with Lee Goldberg writing the script and Ryuhei Kitamura set to direct. It was announced on October 28, 2021, with Phillip Noyce directing and Pierce Brosnan attached to star. In March 2022, James Caan and Morena Baccarin joined the cast. Filming began in April 2022 in New Orleans. In July 2022, screenwriter Lee Goldberg and his company, Adventures in Television, filed a lawsuit against Boomtown Media Partners LLC and Fast Charlie Nola LLC, citing a breach of contract and seeking declaratory relief. Goldberg said he entered a written contract in March 2021 with Boomtown Media to obtain the option to acquire the film rights to Gun Monkeys, which he had written a screenplay for, but Boomtown Media later made Fast Charlie with a different script and without his company's knowledge or involvement. Fast Charlie is the last film to star Caan, who died on July 6, 2022. In the same month, Brosnan posted photos of Caan on the film's set.

References

External links 
 

Upcoming films
American action thriller films
American crime thriller films
American films about revenge
Films about contract killing in the United States
Films about organized crime in the United States
Films based on American crime novels
Films directed by Phillip Noyce
Films shot in New Orleans
Films with screenplays by Richard Wenk
Upcoming English-language films